Sceloporus squamosus, the Mexican spiny lizard or dwarf spiny lizard, is a species of lizard in the family Phrynosomatidae. It is found in Mexico, Guatemala, El Salvador, Nicaragua, Costa Rica, and Honduras.

References

Sceloporus
Reptiles of Mexico
Reptiles of Guatemala
Reptiles described in 1874
Taxa named by Marie Firmin Bocourt